Kevin Leveille  (born August 18, 1981) is an American lacrosse player from Delmar, New York.  As a child, Kevin played youth hockey for the TAYHA Chiefs before finding his true calling as a lacrosse prodigy. Eventually his skills landed him on the UMass Minutemen lacrosse team, and as a senior, he was named to the All-American Team.

Professional career

MLL
He was a member of the Rochester Rattlers in Major League Lacrosse, playing the attack position.  He was traded to Rochester Rattlers before the 2006 season started, and led the team in goals during its inaugural season.

Previously, Leveille had been a member of the Boston Cannons from 2003-05. In 2004 he won the Major League Lacrosse Most Improved Player of the Year Award. In 2005 he played in the MLL All Star Game.  The highlight of the 2005 Season was in Week 5 when he tied MLL record for goals in a game with 9 vs. BAL on July 31, 2005. After Rochester lost in the Steinfeld Cup, a couple days later he retired. Leveilles' number 19 is likely to be retired in the 2015 season.

NLL
Leveille also played professional indoor lacrosse for one season with the Chicago Shamrox of the National Lacrosse League during the team's inaugural 2007 season.

Statistics

Major League Lacrosse

National Lacrosse League

References

1981 births
Living people
American lacrosse players
Chicago Shamrox players
Major League Lacrosse major award winners
Major League Lacrosse players
People from Bethlehem, New York
Sportspeople from New York (state)
UMass Minutemen lacrosse players